Schwarzach in Vorarlberg railway station is a railway station in the municipality of Schwarzach, in the district of Bregenz, in the Austrian state of Vorarlberg. It is located on the Vorarlberg line of Austrian Federal Railways (ÖBB).

Services 
 the following services stop at Schwarzach in Vorarlberg:

References

External links 
 
 

Railway stations in Vorarlberg
Vorarlberg S-Bahn stations